The Spot (Dr. Jonathan Ohnn) is a supervillain appearing in American comic books published by Marvel Comics. The character has been depicted as an enemy of Spider-Man and Daredevil who gained the ability to open interdimensional portals, as well as smaller-scale ones, which he uses to travel long distances instantly and commit crimes.

Jason Schwartzman will voice the character in the 2023 animated feature film, Spider-Man: Across the Spider-Verse.

Publication history

Dr. Jonathan Ohnn first appeared unnamed in Peter Parker, the Spectacular Spider-Man #97 (December 1984) and became the Spot in Peter Parker, the Spectacular Spider-Man #98 (January 1985). He was created by writer Al Milgrom and artist Herb Trimpe.

Fictional character biography

As a former MIT scientist  working for the Kingpin, Dr. Jonathan Ohnn was assigned to reproduce the radiation levels of the superhero Cloak to find a way to artificially mimic his powers. Working late one night, he succeeded creating a solid black circular portal. In doing so, however, the drain on the city's power became so great, a blackout washed over the city, causing the portal to shimmer and destabilize. Fearful of losing a once-in-a-lifetime opportunity, Ohnn stepped into it. The shock of the transition caused him to pass out. He awoke floating weightlessly in a dimension which he initially assumed was Cloak's dark dimension. He soon realized however that the power shortage caused the portal to send him to a different dimension, a place of half darkness and half light. A seemingly infinite number of portals surrounded him in this place. Making swimming motions, he managed to find the original portal that brought him there and slipped back through it. When Ohnn emerged back into his lab, his body had undergone a radical transformation. The portals from the other dimension had adhered to his skin, covering him with black spots from head to toe. Realizing the spots were portable space warps, he started to think he might be able to use them to defeat anyone in battle. When Spider-Man and Black Cat arrived to confront Kingpin, he appeared before them and announced himself as the Spot. Spider-Man collapsed on the roof, laughing at the name. The Spot ended up winning that first confrontation and warned the heroes to leave the Kingpin alone. He later lost a second battle against Spider-Man because he was tricked into throwing too many of his spots as weapons and not keeping enough to defend himself with.

Spot later formed a short-lived team with Gibbon, Grizzly, and Kangaroo called the Spider-Man Revenge Squad, which was better known as the Legion of Losers. This team fell apart when Spider-Man carted the Spot and the Kangaroo to jail for bank robbery and Grizzly and Gibbon left the group as they disagreed with their teammates' more ruthless approach. Sometime later, the Spot was captured by the organization called the Gideon Trust and was forced to open a portal to the Negative Zone. Gideon Trust hoped to investigate and exploit the natural resources of the Zone for their own purposes, but were defeated by the Fantastic Four who were trapped there. The Spot later helped Tombstone escape from a maximum security prison. As thanks, Tombstone snapped his neck. Despite this, he reappeared alive months later and arranged a meeting with Slyde. Both were upset at the reports of Hydra capturing or killing lesser-known supervillains. When the Spot arrived, both he and Slyde were quickly captured by a brainwashed Elektra. They were then resurrected by the Hand to join Hydra's army of superhumans and assault the S.H.I.E.L.D. helicarrier, however the Spot was taken out by Wolverine during the attack. The Spot returned in "Civil War: War Crimes" where he was recruited as part of Hammerhead's supervillain army. However, as Iron Man and S.H.I.E.L.D. forces attacked their forces, it remains unknown if the Spot was incarcerated with other villains, somehow escaped, or amongst the casualties of the raid.

The Spot appeared in MODOK's 11 as part of a team organized by the villain of the same name to steal a weapon/power-source named the Hypernova. In the book, the Spot's intelligence seems to have been reduced to the point that he brags about having once been defeated by Spider-Man. He is showing a self-serving streak and in #3, it was revealed he'd defected to Temugin in return for a larger paycheck. He runs out on the rest of the team - leaving them to die - the instant they get the Hypernova. The Temugin immediately afterward trapped the Spot in the dimension he originally gained his powers from. The Temugin felt he couldn't trust the Spot not to backstab him like he had MODOK's 11. In the Brand New Day issues of Amazing Spider-Man, the Spot is seen in the "Bar With No Name". Later he begins to kill members of the Russian Mafia in revenge because his son was injured in a drive-by shooting and is now in a coma. During the "Dark Reign" storyline, Spot is one among many supervillains who joined the Hood's crime syndicate. It is later revealed he is serving as a mole for Mister Negative (a fellow Darkforce-powered villain) under the promise that he will be cured once the Maggia crime families are killed. During the Origin of the Species storyline, Spot is among the supervillains invited by Doctor Octopus to join his supervillain team where he promises each of them a reward in exchange that they secure some specific items for him. Ever since Lily Hollister's baby was stolen by the Chameleon, Spider-Man had been going on a rampage against any villains involved. The police ended up getting a web ball containing Spot, Diablo, and Overdrive.

Later, Spot worked with a man to kidnap the little girl of a mafia family during the wedding of her family and another mafia family, but the abduction was foiled by Daredevil. Spot was then captured and had his powers replicated by Coyote, a minion of an unknown figure trying to bring Daredevil down. Boomerang and Owl hire Spot onto the Sinister Sixteen, assembled to distract the Chameleon's forces while Boomerang steals from him. Spot was among the villains seen at the Bar with No Name when Black Cat tried to recruit a group of villains. They declined because of her affiliation to Electro. After Black Cat was thwarted by Spider-Man and Silk, Spot and the other criminals at the Bar with No Name joined her army when they wanted her to lead them. After helping the Ringer escape from prison, the Spot battled White Rabbit during a gang war, then attacked a museum, where he was incapacitated by Spider-Man and Spider-Man 2099. As part of the 2016 Marvel NOW!, Spot kidnapped Jessica Jones by punching her to an unknown van. Spot later appeared as a member of the Sinister Six that is led by Aaron Davis in a recolored version of the Iron Spider armor. He accompanied the group in their mission to steal a decommissioned S.H.I.E.L.D. Helicarrier. During the "Infinity Wars" storyline, Spot is among the villains that accompany Turk Barrett to his meeting with the Infinity Watch at Central Park. During the "Hunted" storyline, Spot was seen as a patron at the Pop-Up with No Name. During the "Last Remains" arc, Spot was used by Mayor Wilson Fisk and Norman Osborn to power Project Blank in order to trap Kindred. Project Blank was inspired by the Darkforce Dome that was used to surround Manhattan back during Hydra's takeover of the United States.

Powers and abilities
Using his space warps, the Spot can instantly move himself or any part of his body from one area to another over a theoretically unlimited distance via another dimension nicknamed "Spotworld." 

The Spot can control and manipulate the warps to almost any degree he wishes. He can expand or shrink them to any size, or he can join together multiple spots to form one larger warp. The spots are unaffected by gravity and can be placed against a surface or left suspended in mid-air. He can also designate which spots will lead to the spot dimension from those that will instantly lead to another location in this dimension. He can create new spots, or close them entirely by retreating into his dimension and pulling the warp in behind him (making a quiet "poit" sound). By concentrating, he used to be able to revert to his human appearance. When doing this, the spots merged to form one large black void in his chest, though this was easily covered with a shirt.

The number of space warps the Spot can throw is limited however, since he primarily draws on the ones on his own body. Spider-Man defeated Spot when his body was mostly white. 

His preferred method of attack is to surround his opponent with numerous spots, allowing him to punch or kick them from unexpected angles across great distances. This proved very effective against Spider-Man as his spider-sense was unable to detect incoming attacks from another dimension, effectively negating this ability (and although the Spot's lack of super-strength meant that his punches did not actually do much damage even when they did connect, the cumulative effect could prove dangerous in an extended fight). The same phenomenon was true when Spot flung Spider-Man through a warp and he reappeared in this dimension too close to a wall to dodge. However, on Daredevil, who also has superhuman senses, this trick does not work, as his Radar Sense could easily detect the teleportation energy in the Spot's body, making it simple for him to tell where the Spot was going to attack from. The Spot can also move the spots on his body to protect himself from physical attack by positioning one in the path of a punch or kick, causing the attack to pass harmlessly through a warp. 

Due to Spot's connection to "Spotworld", he appears to possess a form of immortality, being capable of speech even after having been decapitated; and if his physical body is fatally-wounded it will disintegrate and reconsitute itself in the Spotted Dimension.

Alternative versions

Marvel Zombies: Dead Days
In the comic Marvel Zombies: Dead Days, Dr. Jonathan Ohnn (shown in his Spot form) appears in the S.H.I.E.L.D. Helicarrier with the other heroes who survived the Zombie plague.

Ultimate Marvel
The Ultimate Marvel version of the Spot appeared in Ultimate Spider-Man #111. Not much is known about him, except that his name is Frank, and he worked for Roxxon Industries, where an accident gave him his powers. He has similar powers to his 616 counterpart, being able to use the "spots" on his body to attack his opponent from long range. After a fight with Spider-Man, he is apprehended. The main difference in appearance between the Ultimate version and his 616-counterpart is that his spots flow around his body like a lava lamp instead of staying put. From an illustrator's point of view he is not drawn with a Dalmatian-like pattern, but is instead penciled as a white figure and covered in black ink blots when the page is inked.

Amazing Spider-Man: Renew Your Vows
In Amazing Spider-Man: Renew Your Vows (an alternate reality first shown in the Secret Wars storyline where Peter and Mary Jane's marriage never ended), the Spot is one of the few beings with natural powers left free after the powerful Regent attempted to capture all powered beings to absorb their abilities for himself as part of a plan to challenge God Emperor Doom. Although Spot escaped, he apparently left parts of himself behind with the result that his body has obvious 'gaps' where his holes once were, and each time he uses one it takes away more of what remains of his body. Despite this, he 'sacrifices' one hole to save Spider-Man's family when they are attacked by the Sinister Six, and hides another in the Sandman so that the resistance can attack Regent directly.

In other media

Television

 The Spot appears in a self-titled episode of Spider-Man (1994), voiced by Oliver Muirhead. This version is a scientist who originally worked for Tony Stark until Venom and Carnage stole Ohn's technology in previous episodes. Despite being fired by Stark, Ohn was subsequently hired by the Kingpin, who provides him with a lab and assistant named Dr. Silvia Lopez, with whom Ohn soon enters a relationship. After several weeks, Ohn and Lopez finish their work, but he accidentally falls into one of his portals, whereupon numerous more attach to him, giving him the ability to create them at will. Adopting the alias of the "Spot", he uses his newfound powers for personal gain; robbing banks and jewelry stores while lying to the Kingpin about his work. Ohn later learns that the Kingpin is a crime lord after discovering Lopez works for him and tries to take over his criminal empire, but the Kingpin takes Lopez hostage to force Ohn to continue working for him. Ohn is sent to capture Spider-Man, who defeats the latter after using his "spider-sense" to deduce his pattern. Ohn then explains to the web-slinger what happened and the two join forces to defeat the Kingpin, only to discover that one of Ohn's portals was left open too long and it will grow large enough to engulf New York and eventually the Earth. Ohn, Spider-Man, and the Kingpin attempt to close it from the outside, but fail to, leading to Ohn sacrificing himself to close it from the inside, though not before Lopez confesses her love for him and allows herself to be taken with him. Following the incident, Ohn's portal technology is used to create the Time-Dilation Accelerator, which would later be used by villains like the Hobgoblin and Green Goblin.
 An alternate reality version of Dr. Ohn appears in a flashback in the episode "I Really, Really Hate Clones". This version completed his work on interdimensional portal technology for the Kingpin without any accidents, and as such, never became the Spot. He later accidentally brought the Carnage symbiote into his universe, leading to the creation of Spider-Carnage, who combined a bomb with Ohn's Time-Dilation Accelerator in an attempt to destroy the multiverse. However, Madame Web and the Beyonder rewind time and assemble a team of Spider-Men from across the multiverse to stop him.
 The Spot appears in the Spider-Man (2017) episode "Bring on the Bad Guys" Pt. 2, voiced by Crispin Freeman.

Film

The Spot will appear in Spider-Man: Across the Spider-Verse, voiced by Jason Schwartzman.

References

External links
 Spot at Marvel.com

Characters created by Al Milgrom
Characters created by Herb Trimpe
Comics characters introduced in 1984
Fictional characters with immortality
Fictional physicists
Marvel Comics characters who can teleport
Marvel Comics male supervillains
Marvel Comics mutates
Marvel Comics scientists
Marvel Comics supervillains
Spider-Man characters